The Sport was a tugboat, built in 1873 and wrecked in 1920 in Lake Huron. The wreck site, designated 20UH105, was listed on the National Register of Historic Places in 1992.

History
In 1873, lumber and steel entrepreneur Eber Brock Ward commissioned Frank E. Kirby to design this tug. The boat was built by the Wyandotte Iron Ship Building Works in Wyandotte, Michigan. The Sport was the first steel tug on the Great Lakes, and the first vessel made of Bessemer steel in North America. It was designed as a harbor tug, and first used around Wyandotte and the St. Clair River. By 1875, she was assigned to Ludington, Michigan, were Ward owned sawmills. The tug was rebuilt a number of times, and sold to a succession of owners who used it for towing, salvaging and aiding vessels in distress. 

In 1913, the Sport was sold a final time to Captain Robert Thompson of Port Huron, Michigan. Thompson used it as a fire tug in Port Huron, and for other harbor duties.

On December 13, 1920, the Sport set out from Port Huron, bound for Harbor Beach. It encountered a heavy gale, and by 6:00 pm was taking on more water than could be pumped out. The seasick and exhausted firetender returned to his bunk, and the boat lost steam, killing the pumps. The crew abandoned ship at about 11:00 pm, and washed ashore near Lexington, still alive.

The wreck of the Sport was discovered in 1987. In 1992, the Sport became the first Michigan shipwreck with her own Michigan Historical Marker placed on her. The wreck is now part of the Sanilac Shores Underwater Preserve, and popular with divers. The marker was damaged and removed in 2002.

Description
The Sport was 57 feet long, with a beam of 14 feet, and a depth of 9 feet. It had a net tonnage of 23 tons and gross tonnage of 45 tons. The boat had an iron frame with a steel hull over it.

The wreck is in 45 feet of water, with the hull resting upright, listing slightly to starboard. The upper sections of the tug project 20 feet off the bottom. The boat is intact, and a number of tools and relics are scattered around the site.

References

National Register of Historic Places in Sanilac County, Michigan
Buildings and structures completed in 1873
Maritime incidents in 1920
Shipwrecks of Lake Huron
1873 ships
Tugboats on the Great Lakes
Ships built in Wyandotte, Michigan
Wreck diving sites in the United States